Salt Creek Township is one of thirteen townships in Franklin County, Indiana. As of the 2010 census, its population was 1,004.

History
Salt Creek Township was established in 1844.

Geography

Unincorporated towns
 Peppertown

Adjacent townships
 Laurel Township (northeast)
 Metamora Township (east)
 Butler Township (southeast)
 Ray Township (south)
 Fugit Township, Decatur County (west)
 Posey Township (northwest)

Major highways
 Indiana State Road 229

Cemeteries
The township contains six cemeteries: Barnes, Bowman, Marlin, Saint Annes, Saint Nicholas and Stipps Hill.

References
 United States Census Bureau cartographic boundary files
 U.S. Board on Geographic Names

External links
 Indiana Township Association
 United Township Association of Indiana

Townships in Franklin County, Indiana
Townships in Indiana